RNA, Ro-associated Y4 pseudogene 2 is a protein that in humans is encoded by the RNY4P2 gene.

References 

Pseudogenes